The James House, also known as the "Chappie" James House, was the home of Daniel "Chappie" James, Jr. in Pensacola, Florida. It is located at 1606 North Martin Luther King Boulevard. On December 13, 2000, it was added to the U.S. National Register of Historic Places.

References

External links
 Escambia County listings at National Register of Historic Places
 Florida's Office of Cultural and Historical Programs
 Escambia County listings
 Great Floridians of Pensacola

Houses on the National Register of Historic Places in Florida
Buildings and structures in Pensacola, Florida
National Register of Historic Places in Escambia County, Florida
Houses in Escambia County, Florida
Houses completed in 1901
Vernacular architecture in Florida